Leiderman is a surname. Notable people with the surname include:

 B. J. Leiderman (born 1956), American composer and songwriter
 Jay Leiderman (born 1971), American criminal defense lawyer
 Yuri Leiderman (born 1963), Ukrainian artist and writer